Pseudosimnia is a genus of sea snails, marine gastropod mollusks in the subfamily Eocypraeinae of the family Ovulidae.

Species
Species within the genus Pseudosimnia include:

Pseudosimnia adriatica (Sowerby, 1828)
 Pseudosimnia alisonae Lorenz & Rosenberg, 2020
 Pseudosimnia angusta Celzard, 2017
Pseudosimnia carnea (Poiret, 1789)
Pseudosimnia diaphana (Liltved, 1987)
Pseudosimnia flava Fehse, 2003
Pseudosimnia jeanae (Cate, 1973)
Pseudosimnia juanjosensii (Perez & Gomez, 1987)
Pseudosimnia lacrima Simone & Cunha, 2012
 Pseudosimnia minima (Talavera, 1975)
Pseudosimnia nudelmani Lorenz & Fehse, 2009
Pseudosimnia pyrulina (A. Adams, 1854)
Pseudosimnia shikamai (Cate, 1973)
Pseudosimnia vanhyningi (M. Smith, 1940)
Pseudosimnia wieseorum Lorenz, 1985
Species brought into synonymy
 Subgenus Pseudosimnia (Diminovula) Iredale, 1930: synonym of Diminovula Iredale, 1930
Pseudosimnia (Diminovula) fruticum (Reeve, 1865): synonym of Prionovolva brevis (Sowerby, 1828)
Pseudosimnia adriatica Schilder, 1941: synonym of Pseudosimnia adriatica (Sowerby, 1828)
Pseudosimnia alabaster (Reeve, 1865): synonym of Diminovula alabaster (Reeve, 1865)
Pseudosimnia aurantiomacula Cate & Azuma, 1973: synonym of Diminovula aurantiomacula (Cate & Azuma, 1973)
Pseudosimnia bilineata Bozzetti, 2009: synonym of Diminovula bilineata (Bozzetti, 2009) (original combination)
Pseudosimnia caledonica (Crosse, 1872): synonym of Diminovula caledonica (Crosse, 1872)
Pseudosimnia coroniola Cate, 1973: synonym of Diminovula coroniola (Cate, 1973)
Pseudosimnia culmen Cate, 1973: synonym of Diminovula culmen (Cate, 1973)
Pseudosimnia emilyreidae Cate, 1973: synonym of Diminovula kosugei (Cate, 1973)
Pseudosimnia filia Azuma, 1974: synonym of Primovula rosewateri (Cate, 1973)
Pseudosimnia florida Kuroda, 1958: synonym of Primovula roseomaculata (Schepman, 1909)
Pseudosimnia fulguris Azuma & Cate, 1971: synonym of Primovula fulguris (Azuma & Cate, 1971)
Pseudosimnia incisa Azuma & Cate, 1971: synonym of Diminovula incisa Azuma & Cate, 1971
Pseudosimnia kandai Cate & Azuma in Cate, 1973: synonym of Testudovolva nipponensis (Pilsbry, 1913)
Pseudosimnia marginata Sowerby, 1828: synonym of Margovula marginata (Sowerby, 1828)
Pseudosimnia nubila Cate & Azuma in Cate, 1973: synonym of Diminovula whitworthi Cate, 1973
Pseudosimnia perilla Cate, 1973: synonym of Diminovula dautzenbergi (Schilder, 1931)
Pseudosimnia pyrifera Cate, 1973: synonym of Pseudosimnia vanhyningi (M. Smith, 1940)
Pseudosimnia pyriformis Schilder, 1941: synonym of Diminovula alabaster (Reeve, 1865)
Pseudosimnia pyriformis Kuroda, 1958: synonym of Diminovula alabaster (Reeve, 1865)
Pseudosimnia sphoni Cate, 1973: synonym of Pseudosimnia vanhyningi (M. Smith, 1940)
Pseudosimnia striola Cate, 1973: synonym of Diminovula dautzenbergi (Schilder, 1931)
Pseudosimnia translineata Cate, 1973: synonym of Margovula translineata (Cate, 1973)
Pseudosimnia verepunctata Iredale, 1930: synonym of Diminovula alabaster (Reeve, 1865)
Pseudosimnia whitworthi Cate, 1973: synonym of Diminovula whitworthi Cate, 1973

References

 Gofas, S.; Le Renard, J.; Bouchet, P. (2001). Mollusca. in: Costello, M.J. et al. (Ed.) (2001). European register of marine species: a check-list of the marine species in Europe and a bibliography of guides to their identification. Collection Patrimoines Naturels. 50: pp. 180–213

Ovulidae